The South Australian Individual Speedway Championship (commonly known as the South Australian Solo Championship, often shortened to SA Solo Title) is a Motorcycle speedway championship held annually in the Australian state of South Australia to determine the South Australian Champion. The event is organised by the Speedway Riders' Association of South Australia Inc (SRA). and is sanctioned by Motorcycling Australia (MA).

Adelaide born rider Jack Young, winner of the 1951 and 1952 Speedway World Championships, and twice World Finalist and Australian champion John Boulger, hold the record with nine championship wins each. Boulger holds the record of wins in a row with seven between 1971/72 and 1977/78, all at the Rowley Park Speedway in Adelaide. Queenslander Troy Batchelor is next on the list with six wins, with four riders tied on four wins each, they being - Bob Leverenz, Mark Fiora, Shane Parker and Rory Schlein.

Since 1999/2000 all SA Solo titles have been held at the Gillman Speedway in Adelaide, mostly due to the Riverview Speedway in Murray Bridge no longer seeing regular solo racing due to the track renovations in 1999 which included lengthening the track and putting clay in the surface in order to attract Sprintcars and Speedcars. Rowley Park holds the record for most championships held with 27 between 1949/50 and 1978/79.

No South Australian born rider has won the SA title since Rusty Harrison did so in 2002/03. Both Rory Schlein (Darwin) and Troy Batchelor (Brisbane) who have won a combined 10 championships since 2002/03 were born outside of South Australia but relocated to Adelaide and are classed as local riders.

Four international riders have won the SA Solo Championship. Ken McKinlay (Scotland - 1957), Ove Fundin (Sweden - 1961), Nigel Boocock (England - 1969) and Doug Wyer (England - 1980).

The current South Australian champion is Troy Batchelor who won the 2016/17 Championship at the Gillman Speedway on 3 January 2017. It was Batchelor's 6th South Australian title win.

Winners since 1946/47
Unless stated, all riders are from South Australia

References

External links
Honor Roll since 1947

Motorsport competitions in Australia
Speedway in Australia
Speedway